Strumaria unguiculata is a plant species endemic to Western Cape Province in South Africa.

References

Flora of the Cape Provinces
unguiculata
Plants described in 1935
Taxa named by Dierdré A. Snijman